Selenium hexasulfide is a chemical compound with formula Se2S6.  Its molecular structure consists of a ring of two selenium and six sulfur atoms, analogous to the S8 allotrope of sulfur (cyclooctasulfur) and other selenium sulfides with formula SenS8−n.

There are several isomers depending on the relative placement of the selenium atoms in the ring: 1,2 (with the two Se atoms adjacent), 1,3, 1,4, and 1,5 (with the Se atoms opposite). It is an oxidizing agent.

The 1,2 isomer can be prepared by reaction of chlorosulfanes and dichlorodiselane with potassium iodide in carbon disulfide.  The reaction produces also cyclooctaselenium Se8 and all other eight-member cyclic selenium sulfides, except SeS7, and several six- and seven-membered rings.

References

Sulfides
Selenium compounds
Oxidizing agents
Interchalcogens